or Shippei Taro (German spelling: Schippeitaro;  or  is the name of a helper dog in the Japanese fairy tale by the same name.

Translations include "Schippeitaro" in Andrew Lang's Violet Fairy Book (1901), taken from a German copy, and Mrs. James's "Schippeitaro" (1888), which share the same plotline: The mountain spirit and its minions (in the guise of cats in this version) demand a yearly human sacrifice of a maiden from the local village. A young warrior overhears the spirits hinting that their would-be bane was "Shippeitaro", which turns out to be a dog. This dog is substituted for the maiden to be placed inside the sacrificial container, and when the spirits arrive, the warrior and dog attack the cats and vanquish them.

The evil spirits appear as monkeys in most instances of the tale, as in the version of "Shippei Taro" given in  Keigo Seki's anthology (translated into English 1963). In fact, this folktale is classified as  tale type by Japanese folklorists.

Monkey God tales preserved in the medieval anthologies Konjaku Monogatarishū and Uji Shūi Monogatari have been suggested as being the original sources of the orally disseminated versions.

The dog is called Hayatarō or Heibōtarō in the versions at the temple and in folktales of the vicinity. But the dog name has been standardized as Shippeitarō in the region of the shrine.

Nomenclature 

The term  denotes a "bamboo staff" in Zen Buddhism, and is connected with the expression shippegaeshi meaning "repercussion" or "".

In variants, the dog may have Suppeitarō, Suppetarō or a variety of other names, for example, "Hayatarō of Kōzenji temple in Shinano". The dog may not be given any name at all.

The form  (of uncertain meaning) has been adopted as standard or official one for the dog of legend attached to the  shrine, commonly known as Mitsuke Tenjin.

Translations 

[[File:The violet fairy book (1906) (14566716288).jpg|thumb|Schippeitaro out of a barrel (cask),
attacking huge black tom cat.
Young samurai appears quite "foreign-ish".{{right|{{small|―Lang, Andrew (1906) Schippeitaro"}}}}]]
The version of "Schippeitaro" in Andrew Lang's The Violet Fairy Book (1901) was taken from Japanische Märchen und Sagen collected by Professor  (Leipzig, 1885).

The story of "Schippeitaro" (1888) as told by Mrs. T. H. James (Kate James), was number 17 in the "Japanese Fairy Tale Series" printed by Hasegawa Takejirō, who issued many such chirimen-bon or "crepe-paper books". Mrs. James's version follows a storyline identical to Lang's version.

Even though this can be read as "Munesaburō", the artist Suzuki Kason (whose address in Tsukiji matches the colophon one) went by the common name , also written .

 Synopsis 
Below is the summary of the Lang/Mrs. James version:, 

A young adventure-seeking warrior entered an enchanted forest, and he slept in a shrine (or chapel) there, and was awakened at midnight by the noises of cats yelling and dancing. The cats could be heard saying: "Do not tell Shippeitaro!"

Afterwards, the warrior visited a nearby village, and there he answered a girl's plea for help. It was the village custom to sacrifice a maiden to the mountain spirit, and it was her turn that year. She was placed inside a cage (actually a long chest or rectangular basket, as per illustration. Lang gives "cask") and left at the shrine. The warrior made inquiries to find out about the famous dog Schippeitaro (standard modern romanization: Shippeitarō), owned by the prince's overseer, and obtained permission to borrow the dog. The warrior then replaced the maiden inside the cage with Schippeitaro. The cage was brought to the shrine, and the cats arrived. When the huge black cat opened the cage, Shippeitaro jumped out and killed it. The warrior entered the fray and together they killed several more cats, and the rest of them fled. The warrior returned Schippeitaro to his rightful owner, and the village well-remembered the warrior and the heroic dog long after.

 Variants 
The Lang/Mrs. James version which features cats as the antagonists is actually atypical in folktales. In most Shippeitaro tales, the malevolent spirits appear as monkeys (or baboons). However, cats did feature as the antagonist(s) of Shippeitarō in the gesaku novels of the Edo Period (§Old printed books) as well as in the kabuki and kyōgen performing arts.

The village where the victims are sacrifice occurs may be an anonymous location, as in the English chirimen book version or Seki's version from Monou, but may be specified (Cf. §Kōzen-ji below).

Keigo Seki collected a number of variant tales (of the Sarugami taiji or "Destroying the Monkey Demon" type) from various sources. When Seki published Nihon mukashibanashi taisei (1978), his provisional count reached 67 examples. Later,  and  co-edited the Nihon mukashibanashi tsūgan (1977–1998) which added numerous examples. Kōichirō Kōbayashi's paper has collated these and other examples in a table with 227 tale specimens (plus one auxiliary specimen). Noriko Nagata went further and analyzed 258 tale examples of the Sarugami taiji type. Note however that these statistics include tales that are not of the "dog helper" type.

Seki's typical example (or at least the one he chose in his anthology for popular audience) was the "Shippei Taro" collected in Monou District, Miyagi, published in Keigo Seki (ed.), Robert J. Adams (tr.), Folktales of Japan (1963). The priest in the story defeated the so-called "ogres" (whose corpses turned out to be dead monkeys). He used the usual tactic of replacing the sacrificial maiden inside the chest with Shippei Taro, a dog brought from the distant city of Nagahama in Ōmi Province. (Cf. § Tale types below)

Here, "Suppei" is easily recognized as the Tōhoku dialect pronunciation of "Shippei".

The dog may or may not have a name at all. And the name is not entirely consistent. The dog's name may be only a slight variant of Shippeitaro, such as (or an alternate reading (Takeberatarō) or altogether different. The dog may be Shippeitarō/Suppe(i)tarō from Ōmi or Tanba or some other province.

 Shizuoka and Nagano 
According to one scholar the form  tends to occur near Enshū/Tōtomi Province (Shizuoka Prefecture), while  is concentrated in Shinano Province (Nagano Prefecture). One etymological hypothesis is that in the Shinano dialect,  denoted "wolf cub", which probably gave rise to the name Heibōtarō, and Hayatarō may well be a further corruption of this.

 Yanahime-jinja 

However, Ichikawa Danjūrō VII in a piece of document entitled  (Tenpo 3/1832) wrote that the local tradition called the dog  of Tanba Province.

Nagata also hypothesizes that "every dog comes from Shinshū(Shinano) in Sarugami taiji tales of Shizukoa, and this can hardly be unconnected with Kōzen-ji ". One can infer that none of the folktales, at least from Shizuoka, explicitly named Kōzen-ji, as can be verified in Kobayashi's study also.  Yabe concurs with Nagata more assertive states that in the "present-day tradition", the dog "" comes from Kōzen-ji in Shinano. However, the only attestation he uses to corroborate is not genuine collected folklore in intact form, but rather a retold summary given in an 1984 city folklore research book.

The connection is certainly not unfounded, if documents and tales from Nagano are examined. Already during the Edo Period, one origin tale (engi) regarding the temple, entitled  (1794) states that human sacrifices to the Mitsuke Tanjin shrine were ongoing, and the victims were saved, though it was thanks to the holy Buddha medicine, rather than a dog. Another engi of the temple (1793?) also refers to "" requiring villagers be offered inside a coffin.

 vaguely suggested that the legend was created at a late period, by which he may have meant the "latter half of kinsei" i.e. 18th century. And Tokiwa Aoshima supposed that the legend was created after the occasions of the Yanahime-jinja shrine sending 600 volumes of sutra to Kōzen-ji in 1793, and the temple holding a kaichō (public display of its sacred objects) in 1794. Though these hypotheses require further analysis to assay their validity, if the latter were true, then there was always a connection between the shrine legend and Kōzen-ji, though unattested by the Edo period documents found by Yabe.

 Kōzen-ji 
Going back to Nagata's statement, the dog appears to be explicitly mentioned coming from Kōzen-ji temple in several tales among the list compiled by Kobayashi, and unsurprisingly so, since they were all collected (not from Shizuoka) but from the village or the district where the temple lies (Kamiina District, Nagano).

Location of victims
In the version collected from the former  village where the temple stands, the victims are to be left as sacrifice on the altar of the Tenmangū in Enshū,: : "長野縣上伊那郡赤穂村. 遠州府中の天滿宮の祭禮に白羽の矢の立つた家の娘を毎年一人づつ人身御供に立てることになつてゐた。" which is an apt description of the Yanahime jinja (Mitsuke Tenjin) in Shizuoka. The victim chosen received notice via the  shot, a commonplace motif.

In a  comparable version featuring  the victims were non-local and were found  in Mino Province.

Hayatarō's grave
Thus the dog's name was given variously in local folktale, even though the words  are engraved at the burial mound of the dog within Kōzen-ji's temple-grounds. The mound (tsuka), formed by a five-layer stack of stones still stands and is referred to simply as Hayatarō's grave.

 Types of evil spirits 
The evil spirits may be in the form of monkey, cat, rat, badger or "raccoon dog" (mujina, tanuki).

 Tale types 
In Japanese folklore studies, the "Shippeitarō" story is classed under the tale type , categorized as Type 91 by Seki in his paper written in English., note 26 This general tale group is more broad, and includes tales where a dog is not involved at all. The tale group (Sarugami taiji) is assigned Seki No. 256 (NMBS = Nihon mukashibanashi shūsei II; NMBT=~taisei) in Japanese scholarship.

Seki's classification scheme (his Taisei) describes the "Destroying the Monkey Demon" type as akin to AT 300 type, where the 1st subtype involves the murder of priests (but do not feature dogs), and the 2nd type generally involves a traveler (samurai warrior) who seeks out Shippei Taro (or some dog) and together exterminate the monstrous monkeys.

Inada and Ozawa's classification in their Tsūkan compilation establishes the Sarugami taiji type as divided into the 275A  subtype and 275B  subtype, where "Shippeitarō" obviously belongs in the former subtype.

Since the story concludes with the heroes abolishing the practice of offering maidens as human sacrifice, it draws a parallel to the legend of Saint George and the Dragon, and there are certain similarities also to the story of Susanoo saving Kushinadahime from the great serpent Yamata no Orochi.

In the Aarne–Thompson classification, the tale is classed as "The Dragon Slayer" type, AT 300.

 Precursor 
In the medieval anthology Konjaku Monogatarishū occurs a similar story of a sacrifice-demanding monkey god, entitled "How in Mimasaka Province a God was Trapped by a Hunter and Living Sacrifice Stopped". The Shippeitaro tales have been considered orally transmitted versions of this medieval prototype.. Konjaku Monogatari tale, p. 55– and passim; Shippeitaro compared p. 298.

English translations of this medieval version is found in S. W. Jones's Ages Ago: Thirty-Seven Tales from the Konjaku Monogatari Collection (1959), and Michelle Osterfeld Li's study Ambiguous Bodies.

A similar tale is also included in another medieval anthology, the Uji Shūi Monogatari. In either case, the sacrifice demanding deities are an ape named  and a serpent named .

 Old printed books 

This book illustrates spirits of the monkey, fox, kappa, tanuki (raccoon dog), hare, and wolf kind devouring the human sacrifice, and in the culminating scene depicts Shippeitarō defeating wolves, but no cat is featured.

Yet in 's yomihon  ( Bunka 6/1809), the cat features as boss, with the kappa, tanuki  and fox also in the mix. The initial plotline ("dog husband" motif; the dog gets decapitated) bears resemblance to the well-known Nansō Satomi Hakkenden, and the child of a human girl and dog becomes Shippeitarō. At an aristocrat's household, the nursemaid's young daughter Ran makes a mess in the garden, and Shiro is instructed to eat up the defecated mess (or perhaps urine, and is promised to be given the girl as wife in return. The dog later makes conjugal visits by transforming into a man dressed in white, and she becomes pregnant. Shiro is killed by a human love-rival. Ran bears a puppy, but she accompanies the master's daughter to Tosa Province (in Shikoku) where the latter enters marriage, and is separated with the puppy. Thus the text bills Shippeitarō as "there was a dog Shippeitarō in Shikoku", the circumstances are that Shippeitarō who was left behin in Kyōto eventually reaps vengeance from the bakeneko (monster cat) that killed his mother.
 
The story of a supposedly famed dog named Shippekitarō related in Gakutei Kyūzan's work,  (Bunsei 12/1829), which was expanded by  into his  (late type, lengthy kusazōshi) entitled （first and second installations printed Ansei 3/1856).

 Kabuki 
In kabuki, the so-called "gojūsan tsugi mono''" or "Fifty-three stations" group of works, there are those that feature Shippeitarō. The original work of the group was  
 (Bunsei 10/1827).

Later Mokuami wrote the revised work  (First performed Meiji 20/1887), where the children's chant  is written into the script.。

It became commonplace cliché in kabuki for Shippeitarō to subdue the monstrous cat (bakeneko) after Namiki Shōzō wrote the script  (Hōreki 12/1762).

See also 

  (aka Mitsuke-Tenjin)
 
  (white-feather fletched arrow)
 Kōzen-ji#Hayatarō legend

Explanatory notes

References
Citations

Bibliography

 
 
 
 
 
 
 
 
 
 
 
 
  An  in the Monash University collection
  (digicopy @ Institute for Comparative Studies of Culture Tokyo Woman's Christian University)
 Cf.  (Image of edition printed "1889" on cover)
 
 
 
 
 
 
   
 
 
 
 
 
 
 
 
  @ [https://ir.lib.hiroshima-u.ac.jp/00021156 Hiroshima U. repository
 

Japanese fairy tales
Cats in literature
Dogs in literature
Animal tales
ATU 300-399